Firefly (Japanese: 組画, Hepburn: Hotaru) is a 2000 Japanese drama film directed by Naomi Kawase. It was her second drama feature after her 1997 debut drama feature Suzaku and won the FIPREPSCI Prize at its 2000 debut at Locarno for its "personal and universal approach towards the conflict between tradition and modernity". Like Suzaku, the film explores life in rural Japan and draws on Kawase's background as a documentary filmmaker. Together, these two films established Kawase as one of Japan's key contemporary female directors.

Plot 
Ayako, a striptease dancer, falls in and out of a relationship with Daiji, a potter, and returns to her childhood hometown in Nara province, Japan.

Cast 

 Yūko Nakamura as Ayako
 Toshiya Nagasawa as Daiji
 Miyako Yamaguchi as Yasuko

Reception 
Winner of the FIPREPSCI Prize and the C.I.C.A.E. Award at the Festival del film, Locarno, 2000.

Yūko Nakamura won Best Actress at BAFICI (Buenos Aires International Independent Film Festival), 2001.

References

External links 

 Firefly at IMDb
 HOTARU / Firefly at the Japanese Film Database
 Director's website (in English)

2000 films
Japanese romantic drama films
2000s Japanese films